Anthology, Vol. 1: Cowboy Man is a compilation album of country songs by Lyle Lovett, released in 2001.  Two songs ("The Truck Song" and "San Antonio Girl") saw their first release on this compilation; all other tracks were previously released.  

Both previously unreleased tracks were later included on Lovett's 2003 studio album My Baby Don't Tolerate.

Track listing
All songs by Lyle Lovett.
 "The Truck Song" – 3:06
 previously unreleased
 "Cowboy Man" – 2:51 
 From Lyle Lovett, 1986
 "God Will" – 2:15 
 From Lyle Lovett, 1986
 "Farther Down the Line" – 3:06 
 From Lyle Lovett, 1986
 "This Old Porch" –  4:17 
 From Lyle Lovett, 1986
 "Why I Don't Know" – 2:43 
 From Lyle Lovett, 1986
 "If I Were the Man You Wanted" – 3:59 
 From Lyle Lovett, 1986
 "San Antonio Girl" – 3:37
 previously unreleased
 "If I Had a Boat" – 3:09 
 From Pontiac, 1988
 "Give Back My Heart" – 3:02 
 From Pontiac, 1988
 "I Loved You Yesterday" – 2:59 
 From Pontiac, 1988
 "Walk Through the Bottomland" – 4:13 
 From Pontiac, 1988
 "L.A. County" – 3:18 
 From Pontiac, 1988
 "Which Way Does That Old Pony Run" – 4:10 
 From Lyle Lovett and His Large Band, 1989
 "If You Were to Wake Up" – 4:09 
 From Lyle Lovett and His Large Band, 1989

Chart performance

References

2001 compilation albums
Lyle Lovett albums
MCA Records compilation albums